Acacus (Ancient Greek: Ἄκακος or Ἄκακον means 'harmless, guileless'), in Greek mythology, was a king of Acacesium (Ἀκακήσιον) in Arcadia. He was one of the 50 sons of the impious King Lycaon either by the naiad Cyllene, Nonacris or by unknown woman. Acacus was the foster-father of the infant Hermes.

Mythology 
Maia gave birth to Hermes at dawn in a sacred cave on Mount Cyllene in Arcadia, and he was raised by Acacus. He was believed to be the founder of the Arcadian town of Acacesium where he was king.

Notes

References 

 Dionysus of Halicarnassus, Roman Antiquities. English translation by Earnest Cary in the Loeb Classical Library, 7 volumes. Harvard University Press, 1937-1950. Online version at Bill Thayer's Web Site
Dionysius of Halicarnassus, Antiquitatum Romanarum quae supersunt, Vol I-IV. . Karl Jacoby. In Aedibus B.G. Teubneri. Leipzig. 1885. Greek text available at the Perseus Digital Library.
Pausanias, Description of Greece with an English Translation by W.H.S. Jones, Litt.D., and H.A. Ormerod, M.A., in 4 Volumes. Cambridge, MA, Harvard University Press; London, William Heinemann Ltd. 1918. . Online version at the Perseus Digital Library
Pausanias, Graeciae Descriptio. 3 vols. Leipzig, Teubner. 1903.  Greek text available at the Perseus Digital Library.
Sons of Lycaon
Princes in Greek mythology
Mythological kings of Arcadia

Kings in Greek mythology
Arcadian characters in Greek mythology
Arcadian mythology